The following is a list of squads for each nation competing at the 2018 European Women's Handball Championship.

On 29 October 2018 every coach had to submit a list of a maximum of 28 players, whom which 16 were selected for the final tournament. Up to six replacements were granted during the tournament. The final squads were released on 28, 29, and 30 November 2018.

Age, caps and goals correct as of 29 November 2018.

Group A

Denmark
The first 14 players were announced on 8 November 2018. Three players were added on 14 and 17 November 2018. On 30 November, Mathilde Hylleberg was cut from the squad, but was added back on 2 December. However, the next day Line Haugsted replaced her.

Head coach: Klavs Bruun Jørgensen

Poland
The squad was announced on 8 November 2018.

Head coach: Leszek Krowicki

Serbia
A 19-player squad was announced on 13 November 2018.

Head coach: Ljubomir Obradović

Sweden
The squad was announced on 30 October 2018. On 19 November 2018, Mikaela Mässing replaced Johanna Westberg, who missed the tournament due to her pregnancy. On 28 November, Jessica Ryde was added to the extended squad as a 17th player, traveling with the team to France. On 6 December, Elin Hallagård replaced Mathilda Lundström. On 9 December, Lundström re-entered the squad as a replacement for Daniela Gustin, who tore her ACL in the main round match against Montenegro.

Head coach: Henrik Signell

Group B

France
A 24-player squad was announced on 31 October 2018. The final squad was revealed on 26 November 2018.

Head coach: Olivier Krumbholz

Montenegro
The squad was announced on 9 November 2018.

Head coach:  Per Johansson

Russia
A 22-player squad was announced on 8 November 2018.

Head coach: Yevgeni Trefilov

Slovenia
A 20-player squad was announced on 12 November 2018.

Head coach: Uroš Bregar

Group C

Croatia
The squad was announced on 6 November 2018.

Head coach: Nenad Šoštarić

Hungary
The squad was announced on 13 November 2018.

Head coach:  Kim Rasmussen

Netherlands
A 22-player squad was announced on 26 October 2018. Due to a back injury, Danick Snelder missed the tournament. The final squad was revealed five days later. The Netherlands began the tournament with just 15 players in the squad. However, on 5 December, Lynn Knippenborg was added as the 16th player. On 12 December, Dione Housheer replaced Angela Malestein. On 14 December, Malestein re-entered the squad ahead of the semi-final, replacing Housheer. On 16 December, Inger Smits was added to the squad in replacement of Martine Smeets who left the semi-final against France with a calf injury.

Head coach:  Helle Thomsen

Spain
The squad was announced on 6 November 2018.

Head coach: Carlos Viver

Group D

Czech Republic
A 20-player squad was announced on 3 November 2018. The final squad was revealed on 26 November 2018.

Head coach: Jan Bašný

Germany
The squad was announced on 7 November 2018. Mia Zschocke replaced Kim Naidzinavicius, who suffered a torn meniscus and missed the tournament.

Head coach:  Henk Groener

Norway
The squad was announced on 6 November 2018. On 21 November, Silje Waade and Ingvild Bakkerud were added in an extended squad, traveling to France with the team. On 26 November, Amanda Kurtović had to withdraw from the squad due to an ACL injury sustained at the Møbelringen Cup, with Silje Waade replacing her. On 4 December, Camilla Herrem replaced Thea Mørk in the squad due to an injury in Mørk's hamstring muscle.

Head coach:  Thorir Hergeirsson

Romania
The squad was announced on 12 November 2018. A broken hand sidelined previously selected Ana Maria Țicu. Cristina Zamfir and Laura Pristăviță also missed the tournament, and were replaced by Anca Polocoșer and Mădălina Zamfirescu respectively. Eventually Cristina Neagu got injured before the semifinal match and was replaced by Bianca Bazaliu.

Head coach:  Ambros Martín

Statistics

Coaches representation by country
Coaches in bold represent their own country.

References

External links
Official website
2018 European Women's Handball Championship – List of Players

squads
European Handball Championship squads